The 2006 United States Senate election in New Mexico took place on November 7, 2006. The primaries were held June 6, 2006. Incumbent Democrat Jeff Bingaman won re-election to a fifth term in a landslide.

Democratic primary

Candidates 
 Jeff Bingaman, incumbent U.S. Senator

Results

Republican primary

Candidates 
 Joe Carraro, State Senator
 Allen McCulloch, physician
 David Pfeffer, Santa Fe City Councilman

Campaign 
Pfeffer announced on August 23, 2005, that he would be entering the primary. A former Democrat, he supported George W. Bush in 2004 and became a Republican in 2005. In his campaign announcement, Pfeffer focused mainly on border controls with Mexico. He criticised Bingaman in comparison to his own support for reform of the Social Security system and the Iraq War as well as U.S. relations with China, saying "With all due respect, I do not believe the present occupier of the junior seat from New Mexico is doing all that can and should be done on these fronts," he said of Bingaman. "I believe I can do a better job..." Pfeffer also commented that he would have a hard time raising an amount equivalent to Senator Bingaman, a problem faced by any of the latter's potential challengers.

Results

General election

Candidates 
 Jeff Bingaman (D), incumbent U.S. Senator
 Allen McCulloch (R), physician

Campaign 
Bingaman had a 60% approval rating in one poll. He faced no primary opposition. There had been speculation that Bingaman would give up the chance to run for another term to pursue a lobbyists' job in Washington.

Debates
Complete video of debate, October 26, 2006

Predictions

Polling

Results 

Bingaman won every county in the state with at least 56% of the vote.

See also 
 2006 United States Senate elections

References

External links 
 Bingaman's campaign website
 McCulloch's campaign website
 Pfeffer's campaign website
 Pfeffer announces candidacy
 New Mexico Democratic party
 New Mexico Republican party 

New Mexico
2006
2006 New Mexico elections